Let's Go Steady is a 1945 American musical film directed by Del Lord, produced by Columbia Pictures, and starring Pat Parrish, Jackie Moran, June Preisser, and Mel Tormé.

References

External links
 
 Let's Go Steady at TCMDB

1945 films
American musical films
1945 musical films
American black-and-white films
Films directed by Del Lord
1940s English-language films
1940s American films